are a Japanese football club based in Nobeoka, Miyazaki. They play in the Kyushu Soccer League, and finished its 2022 season as the runners-up. They played in the Regional Champions League for the first time in 2022, as they qualified for the competition as 2022 Shakaijin Cup semi-finalists.

Current squad

Coaching staff

League and Cup record 

Key

Honours
Miyazaki Prefectural League 2nd Division (1): 2019

References

External links
Official Website

Football clubs in Japan
Association football clubs established in 2019
Sports teams in Miyazaki Prefecture
2019 establishments in Japan
Nobeoka, Miyazaki